Cortiñas may refer to:

in people
 Jorge Ignacio Cortiñas (1884–1940), Uruguayan political figure, journalist and playwright
 Nora Cortiñas (born 1930), Argentine social psychologist, activist, human rights defender

in other
 The Cortinas (punk band), Bristol-based punk rock band, originally active between 1976 and 1978
 Ismael Cortinas, town in the Flores Department of Uruguay